State Route 129 (SR 129) is an east–west highway in southwest Ohio running from its western terminus at SR 126 and Indiana State Road 252, just east of the Indiana–Ohio state line near Scipio, Ohio.  Its eastern terminus is east of Interstate 75 (I-75) at Cox Road in Liberty Township.  The route's eastern terminus was historically at SR 747 until 1999 when the route was moved south  to the newly built Butler County Veterans Highway.

Butler County Veterans Highway
Butler County Veterans Highway is signed as SR 129 and is a limited access highway from Hamilton to its terminus at Interstate 75.  The highway was conceived in the early 1970s as a link to I-75 from Hamilton.  At the time, Hamilton was the second largest city in the U.S. without a direct connection to an Interstate.  The highway has had three names.  The original name was the Butler County Regional Highway.  Shortly after the highway was built, the highway was renamed the Michael A. Fox Highway in honor of an incumbent Butler County Commissioner and former state legislator.  In 2004 the highway was renamed to the Butler County Veterans Highway.

Major intersections

References

External links

Butler County Transportation Improvement District
Cincinnati Transit Net
Indiana Highway Ends: Indiana SR 252 (with western terminus of Ohio SR 129)

129
Transportation in Butler County, Ohio